Gustavo Adolfo Miño Báez (born 12 June 1984) is a Paraguayan racing cyclist, who most recently rode for UCI Continental team . He rode at the 2014 UCI Road World Championships.

Major results

2006
 2nd Time trial, National Road Championships
2010
 3rd Time trial, National Road Championships
2012
 3rd Time trial, National Road Championships
2013
 1st Time trial, National Road Championships
2014
 1st Time trial, National Road Championships
2015 
 1st Time trial, National Road Championships
2016
 3rd Time trial, National Road Championships

References

External links

1984 births
Living people
Paraguayan male cyclists
Place of birth missing (living people)